Slither is a 1973 American comedy film directed by Howard Zieff and starring James Caan. Caan plays an ex-convict, one of several people trying to find a stash of stolen money. Peter Boyle and Sally Kellerman co-star.  Slither was the first screenplay by W.D. Richter.

Plot
Car thief Dick Kanipsia gets out on parole from a penitentiary. He intends to go straight, but first he goes directly to see an old friend Harry Moss, only to be shocked to see Harry get shot. Harry's dying words tell Dick to find Barry Fenaka, a guy who supposedly knows where to find a stash of stolen cash that Harry has hidden, and mention the name Vincent Palmer to Fenaka. Then, instead of dying slowly, Harry blows himself up with dynamite. As Dick flees the scene, a black van lurks in the trees.

Dick hitches a ride with Kitty Kopetzky, who starts out as a friendly free spirit, then turns into a nut case who robs a diner where she and Dick go to eat. Dick flees during her robbery and catches a passing bus.

Fenaka turns out to be a small-time bandleader. He explains to Dick that he and Harry embezzled $312,000, and paid Palmer to stash it for them. He and his wife take Dick to go get the money. They travel by car, with an Air Stream Land Yacht in tow. At Palmer's office, they find a man named Hollenbeck who tells them that Palmer moved to Pismo Beach.

As they follow Palmer's trail, the trio worry about the black camper van that seems to follow them. It is labelled Willow Camp for Boys and Girls. At the beach, Barry finds out that Palmer is now in Susanville. Somehow, Kitty tracks Dick down and joins the crew. An identical black van joins the first, and when Barry disappears, Dick and the women become convinced that he is in one of the vans.

They track the vans to a trailer camp.   Upon approaching the black vans in the dark, four men jump Dick and beat him.  He returns to the Airstream in pain with what Kitty believes to be a collapsed lung. Dick realizes his attackers are people he has encountered throughout the entire trip. Fearing he will be beaten again at the trailer park, Dick ducks into a bingo game and begins to play, then feigns leaving.  He stops at the exit and turns around to see the four men that beat him standing up from their places at the bingo tables. Kitty then arrives and sits next to Dick, who points out the four men.  Kitty goes over to one of the men (played by Alex Rocco) and sweeps the bingo markers off the card of a large man playing next to him. The large bingo player then punches Rocco's character, starting a brawl that involves all of Dick's attackers, and allowing Dick and Kitty to escape. One of the black vans leaves the camp in a hurry, and Dick pursues them. In the ensuing chase, the other black van eventually catches up and drives Dick and the Airstream off the road. Dick creates a roadblock and forces the black van to crash into a waste pit.

In a shootout with one of the men from the van, Dick wounds his attacker and tracks him to a roadside vegetable stand. The wounded man is Hollenbeck, who confesses that he is really Palmer. He put all the money into the camp, but the location wasn't suitable, and the business failed. Barry arrives in a tow truck, revealing that he had simply gone for a tuna sandwich when Dick and the women thought he was abducted. He is thrilled to learn that the money was used to buy land. Dick walks away in disgust at the whole mess while Barry plots with his wife about how to make money off the land.

Cast
 James Caan as Dick Kanipsia
 Peter Boyle as Barry Fenaka
 Sally Kellerman as Kitty Kopetzky
 Louise Lasser as Mary Fenaka
 Allen Garfield as Vincent J. Palmer
 Richard B. Shull as Harry Moss
 Alex Rocco as Ice Cream Man

Production
Caan later said it was a role he "took because I needed money; there was nothing there."

Reception
Variety wrote the film was "in effect, an excellent, live-action, feature-length counterpart to a great old Warner Bros. cartoon." Vincent Canby of The New York Times wrote that "I may have enjoyed 'Slither' somewhat more than is warranted by the bright but inconsistent material." Roger Ebert awarded three stars out of four, writing, "What makes it goofy, and nice, is that little effort is made to explain things. They just sort of happen as our friends race down the road. What holds everything together is the nice sense of timing displayed by the director, Howard Zieff, who is the guy behind many of the best TV commercials these days." Gene Siskel of the Chicago Tribune gave the film 2.5 stars out of 4, writing that "too often the humor evaporates and we are left with an ensemble of fine actors creating memorable characters stuck with an essentially trivial story." Gary Arnold of The Washington Post called the film "pleasantly wacky and offbeat," with "a likably resilient quality. On several occasions one feels the comic situations failing or going slack, but invariably an inspired bit of business or fresh, witty situation will revive one's interest and snap the movie back into shape." Kevin Thomas of the Los Angeles Times described it as "a thoroughly infectious, delightfully wacky comedy" that "asks nothing of the viewer but to sit back and enjoy himself." Pauline Kael of The New Yorker called it "a suspense comedy that keeps promising to be a knockout entertainment; it never delivers, and it finally fizzles out, because the story idea isn't as good as the curlicues. But it has a pleasant slapstick temperament—a sort of fractured hipsterism."

See also
 List of American films of 1973

References

External links
 
 
 
 
 

1973 films
1970s crime comedy films
American crime comedy films
1970s English-language films
Films directed by Howard Zieff
Metro-Goldwyn-Mayer films
1970s comedy road movies
American comedy road movies
Films with screenplays by W. D. Richter
Treasure hunt films
Films with screenplays by Jack Sher
1973 directorial debut films
1973 comedy films
1970s American films